Coastal Forces was a division of the Royal Navy established during World War II. It consisted of small coastal defence craft which the Navy designated with names such as: Motor Launch, High Speed Launch, air-sea rescue, Motor Gun Boat and Motor Torpedo Boat. It did not include landing craft, trawlers or purpose-built minesweepers. Other Navies operated equivalent boats, but classified and named them somewhat differently.

This article attempts to pull together, for comparative purposes, some statistics concerning the coastal forces of different navies. It starts with the above British definition of "Coastal Forces" and attempts to identify the equivalent boats in other navies.

Coastal Forces of the United Kingdom

Coastal Forces of the United States

Coastal Forces of Germany

Coastal Forces of Italy

Coastal Forces of Japan

Post war

Post war there seemed to be no need for small coastal force vessels. They were generally withdrawn and their functions taken over by larger corvettes, frigates, and destroyers. A few remained in service with Third World navies. The RN's last boats built in any number were the Dark-class fast patrol boats of the mid-1950s; Coastal Forces was reduced in 1957 to a few vessels.

In time, the need for smaller vessels re-asserted itself, as in this experience of the Royal Australian Navy:

Coastal boats reappeared in navies around the world now generally adapted to the need to "patrol" and designated as "patrol boats".

Surviving craft
Following is a list of notable surviving coastal craft from World War II.

See also

Submarine chaser
PT boat
British Power Boat Company producer of the PT boat prototype
Canadian Power Boat Company
Patrol boat
USCG Patrol Boat
Fast Attack Craft modern classification
List of patrol vessels of the United States Navy

References

External links
 Reading list (Royal Naval Museum)
 Coastal, inshore and special naval warfare
 The Coastal Forces Heritage Trust
 Coastal Forces
 UK National Register of Historic Vessels
 Coastal Forces in World War Two - a Brief History
 Coastal Forces up to D Day 1944

World War II naval ships